Leegebruch is a municipality in the Oberhavel district, in Brandenburg, Germany.

Demography

References

Localities in Oberhavel